Olexandrella frederici is a species of beetle in the family Cerambycidae. It was described by Dalens, Giuglaris and Tavakilian in 2010.

References

Dodecosini
Beetles described in 2010